Bukit Batok Single Member Constituency (SMC) is a single member constituency in Bukit Batok of Singapore. It used to exist from 1972 to 1988 as Bukit Batok Constituency and was renamed as Bukit Batok Single Member Constituency (SMC) as part of Singapore's political reforms. The current Member of Parliament for the constituency  is People's Action Party (PAP) Murali Pillai.

History
In 1972, the constituency was formed from merging parts of Bukit Timah, Chua Chu Kang and Bukit Panjang constituencies and was known as Bukit Batok Constituency.

In 2016, incumbent PAP MP, David Ong, resigned due to personal reasons and a by-election was called to replace the empty seat. On 7 May, Murali Pillai won the Bukit Batok by-election against Singapore Democratic Party (SDP) secretary-general, Chee Soon Juan with a vote count of 61.2% to 38.8%.

Town council 
Bukit Batok SMC is managed by the Jurong–Clementi Town Council.

Members of Parliament

Electoral results

Elections in 1970s

Elections in 1980s

Elections in 1990s

Elections in 2010s

Elections in 2020s

References

2015 establishments in Singapore
Singaporean electoral divisions